Horreum or Orraon or Horraon was a Greek city of ancient Epirus. Orraon is located west of the Ammotops. Orraon is located on a hill by the Amvrakikos Gulf which is located in Northwestern Greece. It guards the passage all the way down to the Ioannina Basin.

History
“Ancient Orraon is an impressive ancient Molossian acropolis and archeological site where there is much historical value. Where much has been uncovered, such as various houses, a reservoir, cemetery, and roads". Orraon was founded in the 4th century B.C. while Alcetas I was king. This was the period of the Classical period and Hellenistic period. In 167 BC the Romans destroyed Orraon, but was rebuilt shortly afterwards. The city of Orraon lasted for a short period of time. In 37 BC the town had one hundred houses, twelve streets, and a grave yard. Orraon was abandoned by its people. Its inhabitants were forced to settle in Nicopolis which is located in the south western part of Greece. The city of Nicopolis was founded by Augustus after his victory in the Battle of Actium. Horreum was mentioned by the historian Livy.

Archaeology
In Orraon “most of the houses are still standing two story high and the street plan is still visible". In the town plan twelve narrow parallel streets, in north and south direction, cross two wider streets. By the way the streets run form an oblong town blocks, the insula, and fifteen meters wide. The settlement consisted of 100 houses, built of local limestone. One house occupies the full width of each insula. Some pieces of the houses still remain today. The main parts that are visible today are the stone the houses were made of, window frames, door frames, and a few more features of the house are still visible. Everybody in the town of Orraon used a cistern. The cistern was located near the main gate, which was located in the northeast part of town. The cistern was located in this area because it was the highest point of altitude in the city. They had a closure wall located around the cistern. They put the antae frame placed at the south wall of the tank, and the straight stairs at the northeastern corner of the tank. The stairs helped them to get to the bottom of the tank to clean it as well as getting water out of the tank. The wall was built out of rectangular stones, and limestone. The wall was higher than the cistern to keep people from throwing trash into the tank.

Aftermath
Orraon is a very old historical place.  It helped protect the Basin in Greece. It was destroyed by the Romans, but was built back very quickly.  After being built back Orraon did not last much longer because the inhabitants was forced to leave because Augustus had won the battle of Actium’s.  Some of the remains still remain today. The remains in conclude the stones, some door frames, and windows that was left of the old homes.  Some streets and roads are still visible today.

References

See also
List of cities in ancient Epirus

Cities in ancient Epirus
Former populated places in Greece
Ancient Greek archaeological sites in Greece
Populated places in ancient Epirus